Tamnaherin (possibly from the ) is a townland and small housing estate in County Londonderry, Northern Ireland. In the 2001 Census it had a population of 123 people. It is situated within Derry and Strabane district.

History 
In the early 19th century, Tamnaherin simply consisted of a few scattered rural properties. The relatively recent addition in the 1970s of a Roman Catholic church saw the building of several more properties. Development over the last few years, however, has seen the hamlet grow quite significantly due to the addition of a small housing estate.

See also 
List of villages in Northern Ireland

References 
Sources
NI Neighbourhood Information System
Derry and Donegal

Notes

Villages in County Londonderry
Derry and Strabane district